BC CSKA Kyiv was a Ukrainian professional basketball club that existed from 1946 till 2005. It was founded in 1946 in the city of Kyiv, Soviet Union.

History
The club was founded in 1946 as SKA Kyiv participating in the Soviet basketball championship. As the Soviet Union fell the club being located in the capital of Ukraine changed its name to CSKA-Riko in 1994 and CSKA-Ukrtatnafta in 1999. In 2001 the club was practically dissolved. After changing its name to VPPO (abbreviation for the Air Defense Forces), the club continued to play in lower divisions until 2005 when it ended its existence.

Honors and titles
Ukrainian SuperLeague
 Runner up: 1993, 1999
 Third: 2000
 Ukrainian Cup:
 Winners: 1998, 2000

External links
 Verbytsky, Ivan. "СКА Київ: гвардія помирає, але не здається" (SKA Kyiv: the Guard is dying, but not giving up). basket-planet.com. April 24, 2012.

Defunct basketball teams in Ukraine
Basketball teams in the Soviet Union
Sport in Kyiv
Armed Forces sports society (Ukraine)
Basketball teams established in 1946
1946 establishments in Ukraine
Basketball teams disestablished in 2005
2005 disestablishments in Ukraine